When Love Is Over (French: Après l'amour) is a 1931 French drama film directed by Léonce Perret and starring Gaby Morlay, Victor Francen and Tania Fédor. It is based on the 1924 play After Love by Henri Duvernois and Pierre Wolff.

Cast
 Gaby Morlay as Germaine 
 Victor Francen as Pierre Meyran 
 Tania Fédor as Madame Meyran 
  as Madame Stivié 
 Jacques Varennes as Robert Fournier 
 Jean Joffre as Ferrand 
 Henri Richard as Mertelet 
 Raymond Guérin-Catelain as Gérard 
 Claude Borelli as Petit garçon 
 Jean Borelli as Petit garçon 
 Jean Bara as Petit garçon 
 Jacqueline Brizard as Trèfle 
 Laurette Fleury
 Marcelle Monthil

References

Bibliography 
 Dayna Oscherwitz & MaryEllen Higgins. The A to Z of French Cinema. Scarecrow Press, 2009.

External links 
 

1931 films
French drama films
1931 drama films
1930s French-language films
Films directed by Léonce Perret
French films based on plays
Pathé films
French black-and-white films
1930s French films